Groupe L'Avenir is a media group of the Democratic Republic of the Congo.  The company was founded in 1994 by Pius Mwabilu Mbayu, who remains today as its CEO.  The group owns several media companies, and owns freight companies in the DRC and in South Africa.  The group is based in Kinshasa.

Operations
Groupe L'Avenir companies include:

Media
L'Avenir - daily newspaper
L'Avenir.net
Le Collimateur - weekly
RTGA Printing
Radio Television Groupe Avenir - "RTG@"

Freight
RTGA Freight
RTGA Freight South Africa

References
  French Wikipedia article Groupe L'Avenir

External links
  Groupe L'Avenir.net

Mass media companies of the Democratic Republic of the Congo
Companies based in Kinshasa